The Simmonds Aerocessories OQ-11 was a target drone in the United States, manufactured by Simmonds Aerocessories.

The OQ-11 remained a prototype only.

Specifications

See also

References

External links

1940s United States special-purpose aircraft
Unmanned aerial vehicles of the United States